Sheikh bagh cemetery is the one and only Christian cemetery in the Srinagar city of Jammu and Kashmir. It is a British era cemetery and hence is also claimed as the heritage. The cemetery is accessed by the Roman Catholic church, CNI and other Christian denominations in Srinagar, Kashmir. Many gravestones bear the year 1700. Cemetery contains remains of many famous people like Robert Thorpe and Jim Borst. In 2014, the repair work of the graveyard funded by the British Association for Cemeteries in South Asia was organised, after a flood destroyed it.

List of burials 

 Arthur Neve
 Ernest Frederic Neve
 Robert Thorpe
 Jim Borst
Fanny Jane Butler
Nora Neve

References 

Christian cemeteries
British Indian history
Christian cemeteries by country
Cultural heritage
Cemeteries in India